Stay Cold is the first EP by Baltimore, Maryland hardcore punk band Trapped Under Ice. It was released in 2008 on Reaper Records.

Track list

References

2008 EPs
Trapped Under Ice (band) albums